Govinda is an Indian actor, dancer, comedian and former politician known for his work in Hindi films. Govinda's first film was 1986's Ilzaam, and he has appeared in over 165 Hindi films. In June 1999, he was voted the tenth-greatest star of stage or screen in a BBC News Online poll.

During the 1980s, Govinda's acted in family, drama, action and romantic films. He started out as an action hero in the 80s and reinvented himself as a comedy hero in the 90s. His earlier box-office hits include Jaan Se Pyaara (1992), Dulaara (1994), Khuddar (1994) and Andolan (1995). He was recognised later in the decade as a comic actor after playing a mischievous young NCC cadet in the 1992 romance Shola Aur Shabnam. Govinda had lead roles in several commercially successful comedy films, including Aankhen (1993), Raja Babu (1994), Coolie No. 1 (1995), Hero No. 1 (1997), Deewana Mastana (1997), Dulhe Raja (1998), Bade Miyan Chote Miyan (1998), Anari No.1 (1999) and Jodi No. 1 (2001). He received a Filmfare Best Comedian Award for Haseena Maan Jayegi  and a Filmfare Special Award for Saajan Chale Sasural. He played six roles in Hadh Kar Di Aapne (2000): Raju and his mother, father, sister, grandmother and grandfather.

After a number of box office flops in the 2000s, his later commercial successes included Bhagam Bhag (2006), Partner (2007),Life Partner (2009),And Holiday (2014), In 2015 Govinda became a judge on Zee TV's dance-contest program, Dance India Dance Super Mom Season 2. The show received the highest TRP of any reality-show opening episode.

Film

Television

In 1999 Govinda and his wife appeared on Jeena Isi Ka Naam Hai, hosted by Bollywood actor Suresh Oberoi. Two years later he hosted a game show, Jeeto Chappar Phaad Ke (loosely translated as When the Heavens Open) on Sony TV. Although its first episode had good ratings,
it ended after 13 episodes due to poor TRPs.

In 2002 Govinda appeared on SAB TV's Movers & Shakers, a late-night talk show hosted by Shekhar Suman. The following year, he and his wife Sunita appeared on Rendezvous with Simi Garewal.

In 2012 Govinda appeared on the first episode of SAB TV's Movers & Shakers Masala Markey, a late-night talk show hosted by Shekhar Suman. On 15 December 2013, he appeared on the Colors TV show Comedy Nights with Kapil with Pooja Bose to promote his album. Govinda also sang few lines of the title track, "Gori tere naina", on the show (which was appreciated by legendary Bollywood singer Lata Mangeshkar).

In 2014 Govinda appeared on Star Plus' Mad in India, dancing to some of his hits with Karisma Kapoor. The following year he replaced Mithun Chakraborty as a judge on Zee TV's dance-based reality show, Dance India Dance Super Mom Season 2. The show received the highest TRP for any season opener of a reality show.

References

External links
 Govinda (actor) filmography on IMDb

Indian filmographies
Male actor filmographies